The black-browed fulvetta (Alcippe grotei) is a 15.5 to 16.5 cm long species of passerine bird in the family Alcippeidae. It is found in
subtropical or tropical moist montane evergreen forests, adjacent secondary growth and bamboo in Cambodia, Laos,  Thailand, and Vietnam.

It is often considered conspecific with the mountain fulvetta, Alcippe peracensis, but the two forms differ in morphology and vocalisations, and are separated altitudinally. Black-browed fulvetta occurs primarily below 400 m, and mountain fulvetta above 900 m.

Both have a warm brown back and tail, whitish underparts, a grey face and a slate grey crown edged below with a black line. Black-browed has brown flanks and a weaker white eyering; it has been described as a bit like a cross between mountain and grey-cheeked fulvetta.

The black-browed has a song yu-chi-chiwi-chuwoo, yu-uwit-ii-uwoo, whereas the mountain is yi-yuii-uwee-uwee.

References

Collar, N. J. & Robson C. 2007. Family Timaliidae (Babblers)  pp. 70 – 291 in; del Hoyo, J., Elliott, A. & Christie, D.A. eds. Handbook of the Birds of the World, Vol. 12. Picathartes to Tits and Chickadees. Lynx Edicions, Barcelona.
Robson, Craig; Birds of Thailand, 2002. Princeton University Press, .
Robson, Craig ; A Field Guide to the Birds of Thailand, 2004 
Wildlife of Lao PDR: 1999 Status Report

black-browed fulvetta
Birds of Cambodia
Birds of Laos
Birds of Vietnam
black-browed fulvetta